Modernist theatre was part of twentieth-century theatre relating to the art and philosophy of modernism.

List of modernist plays
Long Day's Journey into Night
Waiting for Godot
Who's Afraid of Virginia Woolf
The Caretaker
A Streetcar Named Desire

List of modernist playwrights
Eugene O'Neill
Samuel Beckett
Edward Albee
Harold Pinter
Tennessee Williams
Anton Chekhov
Bertolt Brecht
Henrik Ibsen

See also
Modernist film
Modernist literature
Theater of the Absurd

References

Modernist theatre